Parliamentary elections were held in Nauru on 6 December 1980. As there were no political parties, all candidates ran as independents. The election was won by supporters of President Hammer DeRoburt, who re-elected him President on 9 December.

Results
Three prominent MPs lost their seats, Minister of Justice Leo Keke, former President Lagumot Harris and Roy Degoregore.

Aftermath
The newly elected Parliament convened on 9 December. David Gadaroa was re-elected as Speaker, with James Ategan Bop re-elected as Deputy Speaker. Hammer DeRoburt was elected President unopposed after the only other nominee declined to participate. He appointed a new government with Kenas Aroi as Minister for Finance, Joseph Detsimea Audoa as Minister for Justice, Buraro Detudamo as Minister for Works and Minister Assisting the President and Lawrence Stephen as Minister for Education and Health.

In July 1981 René Harris resigned to contest a by-election and test his support. The by-election was held on 18 July and saw Harris re-elected with 111 votes; Samuel Tsitsi received 48, August Detonga Deiye received 28 and Ateo Leslie Will Amram 10.

References

Nauru
1980 in Nauru
Elections in Nauru
Non-partisan elections
Election and referendum articles with incomplete results